Christian Walder (born 31 August 1991) is an Austrian World Cup alpine ski racer, and specializes in the speed events of super-G and downhill.

Biography
Walder made his World Cup debut at age 24 on 18 December 2015, in a super-G at Val Gardena, Italy. He reached his first World Cup podium in December 2020 in a super-G at Val-d'Isère, France,
 and competed in his first World Championships in February 2021.

World Cup results

Season standings

Race podiums

 1 podium - (1 SG); 6 top tens

World Championship results

References

External links
 
Christian Walder at the Austrian Ski team official site 
Personal website

1991 births
Living people
Austrian male alpine skiers